Kristína Kučová and Anastasija Sevastova were the defending champions, but chose not to participate.

Lina Gjorcheska and Diāna Marcinkēviča won the title, defeating Alexandra Cadanțu and Jaqueline Cristian in the final, 3–6, 6–3, [10–8].

Seeds

Draw

External Links
 Draw

L'Open Emeraude Solaire de Saint-Malo - Doubles
L'Open 35 de Saint-Malo